The Duff Baby House is an historic house located in Windsor, Ontario, Canada.

History
The house was built between 1792 and 1798 by Alexander Duff as a fur trade post. In 1807 the building was bought by James Baby and it is alleged to have been used as the headquarters of U.S. General Harrison, Colonel Henry Proctor, and General Isaac Brock until it was ravaged by the British during the War of 1812.

The two-and-a-half-story timber structure was refinished as Baby's residence in 1816. It is located at 221 Mill Street in Old Sandwich Town, which is the oldest part of Windsor, where settlements date back to the mid-18th century. The Duff Baby House is also one of the best-preserved and oldest Georgian-style houses in Ontario. Today the building is owned by the Ontario Heritage Trust and houses government offices.

Windsor's Community Museum operates a local history interpretive centre behind the Duff Baby House.

References

External links

Duff-Baby House profile at Ontario Heritage Trust

Buildings and structures in Windsor, Ontario
Houses in Ontario
Georgian architecture in Canada
Ontario Heritage Trust
Designated heritage properties in Ontario